Upper Boat Halt railway station served the village of Upper Boat in South Wales until the 1950s.

History and description
All the halts built on the line were very basic affairs, most being without platforms, though unlike the others, Upper Boat had a footbridge to allow passengers to reach the 'down' platform.

Upper Boat was given the 'halt' suffix in 1924 after the GWR took control of the line in order to avoid confusion with Upper Boat railway station on the former Cardiff Railway. This, in contrast, was a substantial station with a large building.

It did not take long for the GWR to curtail what it saw as the unnecessarily dense network of railways in the region, which prior to the Railways Act 1921 had all been in competition with each other. In 1924, Upper Boat Halt was listed as a request stop, and again in 1926– and then only on certain services.

The halt closed in 1956 when traffic on the line was withdrawn.

References

Railway stations in Great Britain opened in 1904
Railway stations in Great Britain closed in 1956
Former Great Western Railway stations
Disused railway stations in Rhondda Cynon Taf